is a hot spring resort located in the city of  Kurobe, Toyama Prefecture, Japan, at the entrance of the Kurobe Gorge.

History and description
Unazuki  Onsen was opened in the 1923 Taisho period. Over the years, many poets and writers have visited the thermal springs. There are Ryokan and hotels along the Kurobe River. Unazuki onsen is a sightseeing base of Kurobe Gorge Railway. Unazuki onsen shares the hot spring water with the nearby Kuronagi Onsen by a 7 km water pipe.

Unazuki Onsen Ski Resort was opened in 1956.

Nearby in the Unazuki International Center is the Selene Museum of Art. The collection features work by Japanese artists; much of the work focuses on the natural environment of the Kurobe Gorge.

Along the Kurobe River, there are 20 spring sources where the mineral water flows from the ground.

Water profile
The clear mineral water emerges from the source at 98 °C, pH8.15; the water has a mild sulfur smell.

A communal soaking pool is located in front of the railway station, along with a foot bath.

Access

Railway 
West Japan Railway Company (JR West)  – Hokuriku Shinkansen
 

 Toyama Chihō Railway
 
Kurobe Gorge Railway

See also 
 Kurobe Gorge
 Unazuki, Toyama

References

Hot springs of Japan
Tourist attractions in Toyama Prefecture
Spa towns in Japan
Kurobe, Toyama